Sergei Aleksandrovich Barsukov (born 28 January 1985) is a Russian former professional football player.

Club career
He played 7 seasons in the Russian Football National League for 5 different teams.

External links
 
 

1985 births
Sportspeople from Saratov
Living people
Russian footballers
Association football goalkeepers
FC Lada-Tolyatti players
FC Chernomorets Novorossiysk players
FC SKA-Khabarovsk players
FC Lokomotiv Moscow players
FC Sokol Saratov players
FC Nosta Novotroitsk players